is a type of Japanese pottery traditionally from Shimane Prefecture.

External links 
 http://www.pref.shimane.lg.jp/industry/syoko/sangyo/dentou_kougei/kougei/kougei_03.html

Culture in Shimane Prefecture
Japanese pottery